Anthony Edward McKenna (born 19 January 1969, Lytham St Annes, Lancashire, England) is a former English cricketer.  McKennna was a right-handed batsman, who bowled right-arm medium pace.

McKenna represented the Yorkshire Cricket Board in List A cricket.  His debut List A match came against the Gloucestershire Cricket Board in the 1999 NatWest Trophy.  From 1999 to 2001, he represented the Board in four List A matches, the last of which came against the Northamptonshire Cricket Board in the 2001 Cheltenham & Gloucester Trophy.  In his five List A matches, he scored 57 runs at a batting average of 11.40, with a high score of 43.  In the field he took one catch.  With the ball he took one wicket at a bowling average of 35.00, with best figures of 1 for 25.

References

External links
Anthony McKenna at Cricinfo
Anthony McKenna at CricketArchive

1967 births
Living people
People from Lytham St Annes
Sportspeople from Lancashire
English cricketers
Yorkshire Cricket Board cricketers